Open-pit coal mining in the United Kingdom is in decline. Output has fallen every year since 2010. Most came from Scotland, with the largest operator there being the Scottish Coal subsidiary of Scottish Resources Group. Actual production in 2010 was over 13 million tonnes but this has declined to less than 8 million tonnes in 2014. Deep coal mining stopped completely at the end of 2015 and the UK is planning to phase out the use of coal to produce electricity by 2024.

Until 2014, statistics on open-pit coal mining were compiled by the British Geological Survey from information provided by local planning authorities. Open-pit coal mines usually last four or five years at extraction rates of up to a quarter-million tons a year.

Sites active after 2016
In September 2017, there were 9 sites operating in the UK with a total manpower of 590. Production has declined to around 3 million tonnes in 2017.

The Ffos-y-fran Land Reclamation Scheme is now (as of October, 2021) the only major open pit operating in the UK with a few small to very small other sites (employee count much less than 50 per mine for all sites other Ffos-y-fran) still in operation. Also, no major applications are pending to open new mines as of October, 2021.

Wales 
Miller Argent run the Ffos-y-fran Land Reclamation Scheme in eastern Merthyr Tydfil, which involves mining the coal from under 367 hectares of land made derelict by earlier coal-mining operations; the coal will be provided to the Aberthaw Power Station on the Glamorgan coast. The project started in 2007 and is expected to last 17.5 years. Aberpergwm was also reopened in 2018. Note, that according to this source, this mine is an underground drift mine, and not an open-pit mine.

Celtic Energy only operated the expanded East Pit, until Nant Helen was reopened in 2019 to replace the soon to be closed East Pit. The site's licence was revoked in June 2020; thus mining is to stop.

Scotland
Hargreaves plc operated one site in Scotland, House of Water in Ayrshire;
the site stopped operating in 2020.

England
Banks Mining started working on its Bradley site in May 2018 amid protesters camping on the site. Banks had three additional operation sites in Shotton, and Brenkley Lane both in Northumberland, and Rusha in Scotland.
All of these sites are closed (or under restoration) as of August, 2020 but Banks were awaiting decisions on two proposed sites to open (Druridge Bay and Newcastle). The application for Druridge Bay was rejected on 8 September 2020 for a second time, and Banks company decided not to appeal this time, making the decision final. The application for opening a mine in Newcastle (Dewley Hill) was rejected on 18 December 2020.

A mine in Hartington, Derbyshire was still operating in August, 2020 but was planning on closing by the end of 2020. It closed in September, 2020.

Recent history
The following information relates to 2016 and earlier.

Production
In November 2015, the UK Government announced that all the remaining coal-fired power stations would be closed by 2025. In February 2020 the UK government said that it would consult on bringing the closure date forward to 2024.

Scotland

Hargreaves plc announced in 2016 the closure of the following operations:
 Broken Cross in South Lanarkshire
 Duncanziemere and Netherton in Ayrshire
 St. Ninians and Muir Dean in Fife
 Glenmuckloch in Dumfriesshire

Wales 
Tower Colliery site in Hirwaun
The deep mine at Tower Colliery closed in 2008, but there is a plan to build an 80-hectare 165-metre open-pit mine to extract a remaining 6Mton reserve of anthracite, for which a planning application was registered in July 2010. The opencast operation stopped production in March 2017 after it was unable to sell the coal to Aberthaw Power Station due to stricter environmental controls.

Nant-y-Mynydd
Energybuild Ltd operated an opencast site here; it was estimated to have 450 kton of recoverable coal in 2006, which has mostly been excavated between 2006 and 2009.  The overburden was sold as road stone.

Selar
The site was approved in 1995 but operation was delayed until 1997. Celtic Energy operated a mine at Selar in the Neath Valley. Planning permission was granted to extend the extraction by 800,000 tonnes in 2013 which will keep the mine operational until 2020. The site was mothballed in 2015 due to low coal prices. Celtic Energy now only operates only the expanded East Pit.

Nant Llesg
Miller Argent planned to extract 6m tonnes of coal at Nant Llesg, near Rhymney. Their application was rejected by Caerphilly county borough council on 7 August 2015. The company is considering an appeal.

England
Banks Mining applied in October 2015 for planning permission to extract about three million tonnes of coal and other minerals from the Highthorn site in Northumberland. The application was rejected in March 2018.

UK Coal (company, England and Scotland) 

Active sites in 2010
 Long Moor: 725 kton initial reserve
 Lodge House (Derbyshire): 1Mton initial  reserve; further 800 kton awaiting planning approval August 2011 
 Cutacre (Greater Manchester, between Bolton and Salford): 900 kton initial reserve
 Steadsburn (fifteen miles north of Newcastle upon Tyne): 1Mton initial reserve plus 300 ktons of fireclay
 Stobswood, at Stobswood near Morpeth in Northumberland.

UK Coal prospective sites in 2010
In 2010, UK Coal had the following prospective sites in England and Scotland.
 Hoodsclose, Co. Durham (2200 kton coal + 500 kton fireclay) 
 Potland Burn, Northumberland (2,000 kton), note 1
 Park Wall North, Co. Durham (1275 kton), note 1
 Bradley, Co. Durham (550 kton) - rejected in February 2011  though UK Coal is appealing 
 Huntington Lane, Shropshire (900 kton), note 2
 Blair House, Fife (700 kton)
 Former Minorca Colliery (Measham, Leicestershire); 1250 kton + 250 kton fireclay - planning permission granted July 2011, production expected to commence summer 2012 
 Butterwell Disposal Point (Northumberland); 1000 kton + 200 kton fireclay, note 1

Notes
 These three sites are now owned by UKCSMR Limited.
 Coal extraction at Huntington Lane ended in 2013 but, in May 2015, it was claimed that the site had been "left as an eyesore".

Site restoration
The Sunday Herald reported on 13 July 2014 that "Mines in Ayrshire, Lanarkshire and Fife, abandoned by Scottish Coal when it went bust in April 2013, are threatened by rising water levels, contaminated lagoons and erosion".

On 9 July 2015 an Opencast Coal Summit was held to "explore what the planning system can do to ensure all opencast coal sites are fully and sustainably restored for the benefit of communities and the environment".  After the summit a report was published by Carl Sargeant AM, the Welsh Minister for Natural Resources.

Opposition
Open-pit coal mining is opposed by the Loose Anti-Opencast Network (LAON) and by Greenpeace and Friends of the Earth.

See also
List of active coal-fired power stations in the United Kingdom

References 

Coal mining in the United Kingdom
Surface mines in England